Rostislav Petera (15 September 1909 – 21 July 1980) was a  Czechoslovak catholic politician. Petera was a member of the catholic Czechoslovak People's Party. From 1969 to 1971 and from 1976 to 1980 he was a member of the Federal Assembly of Czechoslovakia. In 1970 he became the general secretary of the Czechoslovak People's Party and in 1973 Petera was elected - as the successor of Antonín Pospíšil - the chairman of the party. He continued with the pro-Communist course. From 1973 to 1980 he was minister without portfolio in the Czechoslovak government.

See also

 Christian and Democratic Union – Czechoslovak People's Party

1909 births
1980 deaths
Politicians from Brno
People from the Margraviate of Moravia
Leaders of KDU-ČSL
Government ministers of Czechoslovakia
Members of the Chamber of the Nations of Czechoslovakia (1969–1971)
Members of the Chamber of the Nations of Czechoslovakia (1971–1976)
Members of the Chamber of the People of Czechoslovakia (1976–1981)